Ləgər or Leger may refer to:
Aşağı Ləgər (disambiguation), multiple locations in Azerbaijan
Yuxarı Ləgər, Azerbaijan